The KDUH-TV Mast was a  guyed mast built in 1969 for TV transmitting at Hemingford, Nebraska, in the US, at . The tower broadcast KDUH-TV of Scottsbluff, a semi-satellite of Rapid City, South Dakota-based KOTA-TV.

The tower collapsed on September 24, 2002, during reconstruction work.  Two tower workers, Lawrence A. Sukalec, 59, of Valier, Illinois, and Daniel E. Goff, 25, of Sesser, Illinois, were killed in the process, and three were injured on the ground.

The collapse occurred as strengthening measures were being taken so the 30+ year-old tower could accommodate the added weight of digital television transmission facilities. Investigations later found that the contractors neglected to stabilize the tower while original structural components were being replaced with stronger ones.

KDUH-TV resumed full-power broadcasts one year later from the new Duhamel Broadcasting Tower Angora, near Angora, Nebraska.

See also
List of masts

External links
 
 Pictures at fybush.com

Buildings and structures in Box Butte County, Nebraska
Towers in Nebraska
Disasters in Nebraska
Collapsed buildings in the United States
Radio masts and towers in the United States
2002 disestablishments in Nebraska
2002 disasters in the United States
Buildings and structures demolished in 2002
1969 establishments in Nebraska
Towers completed in 1969
Demolished buildings and structures in Nebraska